Tillandsia duratii is a species in the genus Tillandsia, subgenus Phytarrhiza. This species is native to Bolivia, Paraguay, Argentina, Uruguay, and Brazil.

Cultivars
 Tillandsia 'Burnt Fingers'
 Tillandsia 'Lilac Spire'
 Tillandsia 'Pacific Blue'
 Tillandsia 'Wo'

References

BSI Cultivar Registry Retrieved 11 October 2009

duratii
Flora of Bolivia